A backpacker is a person who participates in any of several forms of backpacking.

Backpacker or backpackers may also refer to:

 Backpacker (magazine), an American magazine about wilderness hiking and adventure
 Backpacker (video game series), a series of Swedish computer games in which the player travels the world and answers questions about each locale
 Backpackers (TV series), an Australian TV series following travelling backpackers in Europe
 Backpackers (web series), a Canadian comedy web series, later adapted for American television
 Backpacker, Australian and New Zealander slang for inexpensive sleeping accommodations, such as a hostel

See also
 Mochilero (drug courier), Spanish for "backpacker"